James M. Davis (born 1948) is the former chief financial officer of Stanford Financial Group. On 27 August 2009 he pleaded guilty to charges of fraud and obstruction of Justice in relation to a $7 billion investment fraud Ponzi scheme allegedly run by the company. On January 22, 2013, Davis was sentenced to five years in jail for his part in the Stanford Financial fraud. He admitted that he was aware of Allen Stanford's misuse of funds and he assisted in keeping the misuse of funds quiet. Davis was also sentenced to three years of supervised release and had a judgment of $1 billion placed against him. He finished serving his sentence at Memphis FCI and was released on July 24, 2017.

See also

Ponzi scheme
Allen Stanford
Laura Pendergest-Holt
Stanford Financial Group

References

External links
 SEC website with details of Stanford case
 Stanford Financial Group
 Stanford International Bank Ltd.
 Stanford Financial Group Receivership
 The Stanford Ponzi Scheme: Lessons for Protecting Investors from the Next Securities Fraud: Hearing before the Subcommittee on Oversight and Investigations of the Committee on Financial Services, U.S. House Of Representatives, One Hundred Twelfth Congress, First Session, May 13, 2011

1948 births
Living people
American white-collar criminals
American confidence tricksters
American chief financial officers
Stanford Financial Group
American people convicted of fraud
People from Tupelo, Mississippi
American businesspeople convicted of crimes
Businesspeople from Mississippi
20th-century American businesspeople